Gardiner Island may refer to:
 Gardiner Island (Nunavut), Canada
 Gardiners Island, New York, USA

See also
 Garden Island (disambiguation)
 Gardner Island